2 In 3 is an album by Israeli folk duo Esther & Abi Ofarim. It was released on Philips Records in Europe in 1967. This is their most successful album, containing their hits "Cinderella Rockefella" and "Morning of My Life."

Recording and release 
After signing with Phillips Records in West Germany in 1963, Esther Ofarim and her husband Abi Ofarim became the country's top-selling pop recording artists. Following the success of Das Neue Esther & Abi Ofarim Album, the duo sing in eight different languages on the album 2 In 3, which was recorded in various European cities. Philips started off the album with initial pressings of 100,000 copies, a record for Germany at the time. 2 In 3 became Esther & Abi Ofarim's third No.1 album in Germany and it reached No. 6 on the UK Albums chart.

The album contains the Barry Gibbs penned song "Morning of My Life." Esther & Abi Ofarim released the first version of this song in 1967. The Bee Gees later released other renditions. Esther & Abi Ofarim performed the song on the television special Gala-Abend der Schallplatte 1967 (Gala Disk Evenings 1967), the first color telecast in Europe. The single peaked at No. 2 in Germany and No. 9 in Austria.

The second single, "Cinderella Rockefella," became their biggest hit. The song was written by Mason Williams, a writer for the American TV series The Smothers Brothers Comedy Hour. Esther & Abi Ofarim first performed the song on the show in April 1967. The single was released in February 1968 and soon reached the top 10 in numerous countries, including No. 1 in the UK.

Track listing

Chart performance

References 

Esther & Abi Ofarim albums
1967 albums
Philips Records albums
Albums produced by Abi Ofarim